Take Care of My Little Girl is a 1951 drama film directed by Jean Negulesco and starring Jeanne Crain, Dale Robertson, Mitzi Gaynor and Jean Peters.

The film, shot in Technicolor, is based on the 1950 novel of the same name written by Peggy Goodin. It received generally favorable reviews.

Plot
Liz Erickson (Jeanne Crain) is a young, naive woman who has recently graduated from high school. Along with best friend Janet Shaw (Beverly Dennis), she leaves her parental home to attend Midwestern University, where her mother was once a legendary student.

Liz and Janet dream of being pledged by the elite group of girls who call themselves Tri-U Sorority. Liz thinks that joining a sorority is more important than her education, and is surprised that her roommate Adelaide Swanson (Mitzi Gaynor) is not interested in Tri-U.

During her first weeks of college, Liz has no trouble befriending Tri-U's members, including Dallas Prewitt (Jean Peters), Marge Colby (Betty Lynn), Merry Coombs (Helen Westcott) and Casey Krausse (Carol Brannon). Janet, on the other hand, does not make an impression on the snobbish girls. Neither does shy Ruth Gates (Lenka Peterson), whose mother was a respected Tri-U, but she (unlike Janet) is admitted to the pledge due to her family name. Liz is pledged as well. She feels guilty for seeing her dream come true, while Janet, crushed by the rejection, is leaving the college.

Liz also meets Joe Blake (Dale Robertson), a college senior and former soldier who is opposed to sororities due to their snobbish cliques. Liz is pushed by arrogant Dallas to date Chad Carnes (Jeffrey Hunter), the most popular fraternity boy, whose reputation is as a drunken womanizer. Chad wins her affection but convinces her to help him cheat at an important exam. Her sorority sisters acclaim her as a hero, but Joe disapproves of her lack of ethics.

"Hell Week" begins, which includes humiliating and playing pranks on the new pledges. On the insistence of Dallas, Ruth is released from the pledge, while Liz is assigned to go on silly errands. She runs into Joe, agreeing to accompany him to a party. Chad is tipped-off by a fraternity pledge that she went to the party, and he chastises Liz for ignoring her duties. Joe sticks up for her, and the two men get into a brief one-sided fist fight. Realizing that Joe is the one she wants to be with, she rejects Chad, removes her pledge pin and returns to Tri-U.

Liz is disgusted to find out that Ruth has been de-pledged. She finds Ruth wandering the streets. Liz takes her to a hospital, where she is diagnosed with pneumonia. Ashamed for being part of a clique that has done this, Liz heads back to Tri-U to return her pin. The girls feel that she must be out of her mind for doing this, but Liz castigates them for their hypocrisy and snobbishness. She leaves with Joe, wondering how her mother will react.

Cast
Jeanne Crain as Elizabeth 'Liz' Erickson
Dale Robertson as Joe Blake
Mitzi Gaynor as Adelaide Swanson
Jean Peters as Dallas Prewitt
Jeffrey Hunter as Chad Carnes
Betty Lynn as Marge Colby
Helen Westcott as Merry Coombs
Lenka Peterson as Ruth Gates
Carol Brannon as Casey Krausse
Natalie Schafer as Mother Cookie Clark
Beverly Dennis as Janet Shaw
Kathleen Hughes as Jenny Barker
Peggy O'Connor as June
Marjorie Crossland as Olive Erickson
John Litel as John Erickson

Production
In February 1950, it was announced that Anatole Litvak was set to direct and produce the film. Even before, in January, a press report was released in which it was revealed that either Susan Hayward or Jeanne Crain was set for the leading role. The role was eventually played by Crain.

Jean Negulesco later took over the direction. Darryl F. Zanuck was very enthusiastic about the film, and allowed for the budget to be increased so Negulesco could film additional scenes. Jean Peters was cast in October 1950. She was given the role by Negulesco after impressing him with her sewing.

By late 1950, the film was the subject of much controversy. Along with another film critical of fraternities and sororities, For Men Only (1951), many sororities in the country protested against the film and pressured the studio, 20th Century Fox, not to release it. One reviewer noted that "even before the film was made, het-up sorority sisters blasted it like fruit growers protesting The Grapes of Wrath." Most of the complaints were later dropped due to the publicity they were generating for the film.

Reception
The film received generally favorable reviews, although it was criticized by some reviewers for being "too one-sided". In addition, a critic of Newsweek complained that "no hint of the novel's objection to religious or racial prejudice sneaks into the movie."

Radio adaptation
Take Care of My Little Girl was presented on Lux Radio Theatre February 4, 1952. The one-hour adaptation starred Crain and Robertson in their roles from the film.

References

External links

 

1951 films
20th Century Fox films
American romantic drama films
Films scored by Alfred Newman
Films about fraternities and sororities
Films based on American novels
Films directed by Jean Negulesco
1951 romantic drama films
1952 drama films
1952 films
1950s English-language films
1950s American films